Springfield Local High School is a public high school in Springfield Township, Ohio, United States, near New Middletown.  It is the only high school in the Springfield Local School District. Athletic teams compete as the Springfield Tigers in the Ohio High School Athletic Association as a member of the Mahoning Valley Athletic Conference.

References

External links
 District Website

High schools in Mahoning County, Ohio
Public high schools in Ohio